The 2019–20 Martyr's Memorial A-Division League season, also known as the Qatar Airways Martyr's Memorial A-Division League  for sponsorship reasons, was the 43rd edition of the Martyr's Memorial A-Division League since its establishment in 1954/55. A total of 18 teams competed in the league. The season began on 14 December 2019 and concluded on 15 February 2020.

Manang Marshyangdi Club were the defending champions.

Machhindra Football Club were crowned as league winners for the first time in club's history on the last day of the league, after defeating Nepal Army Club by 1–0. However, as only one club, Tribhuvan Army Club, could secure AFC club licensing, the second-placed team was qualified for the 2021 AFC Cup preliminary round 1.

Teams
A total of 14 teams, all based in the Kathmandu Valley, contested the league with a relegation system. As there was no relegation in the previous season, all teams from the 2018–19 Martyr's Memorial A-Division League participated in the league.

Location

Personnel and kits 

1. On the back of shirt.

Foreign players 
The ANFA allowed a maximum of four foreign players including one from SAARC-affiliated country per team.

Venues
The league was played centrally in three venues in two cities in the Kathmandu Valley.

1. Matches were scheduled to be played at Halchowk Stadium, however, due to the bad condition of the pitch, no matches were played here.

League table

Positions by round

Season statistics

Scoring

Top Scorers

Hat-tricks

Clean sheets

Discipline

Player

 Most yellow cards: 4
 Adama Doumbia (Jawalakhel Youth Club)
 Hem Tamang (Nepal Police Club)
 Prabesh Kunwar (Nepal Police Club)
 Stepahne Samir (Himalayan Sherpa Club)

 Most red cards: 2
 Niraj Basnet (Himalayan Sherpa Club)

Team

 Most yellow cards: 27
 Chyasal Youth Club

 Most red cards: 3
Manang Marshyangdi Club

Awards

End-of-season awards

References

External links

RSSSF
ANFA Facebook
ANFA Official Site

Martyr's Memorial A-Division League seasons
2019–20 in Nepalese football
Nepal